Danger Quest is a 1926 American silent action film directed by Harry Joe Brown and starring Reed Howes, Ethel Shannon and J.P. McGowan.

Cast
 Reed Howes as Rob Rollins 
 Ethel Shannon as Nan Colby 
 J.P. McGowan as Col. Spiffy 
 David Kirby as Spatz Barrett 
 Billy Franey as Rolf Royce 
 Fred Kohler as Otto Shugars 
 George Reed as Umhatten 
 Rodney Keyes as Inspector

References

Bibliography
 Munden, Kenneth White. The American Film Institute Catalog of Motion Pictures Produced in the United States, Part 1. University of California Press, 1997.

External links

1926 films
1920s action films
American action films
Films directed by Harry Joe Brown
American silent feature films
Rayart Pictures films
1920s English-language films
1920s American films
Silent action films